The Mississippi Valley State Devilettes basketball team represents Mississippi Valley State University in Itta Bena, Mississippi, in NCAA Division I competition. The school's team competes in the Southwestern Athletic Conference and plays home games in the Harrison HPER Complex.

History
The Devilettes have never made the NCAA Tournament, but they did play in the 2012 WNIT, losing 68–61 to Tulane in the First Round.

Postseason appearances

References

External links